Jordan Roberts (born 2 January 1993) is an English footballer.

Career

College
Roberts played four years of college soccer at Quincy University between 2011 and 2014. At Quincy, Roberts scored 52 goals in 82 appearances.

Roberts also appeared for USL PDL side St. Louis Lions in 2014.

Professional
Roberts signed with USL side Saint Louis FC on 10 March 2015. He made his first professional appearance during a match against Wilmington Hammerheads FC at World Wide Technology Soccer Park on 9 May 2015.

Personal life
Roberts' father, Alan, played more than 200 matches in the English Football League in the 1980s before his career was ended by injury.

References

External links

Quincy University bio
Saint Louis FC bio

1993 births
Living people
English footballers
English expatriate footballers
Expatriate soccer players in the United States
Quincy Hawks men's soccer players
St. Louis Lions players
Saint Louis FC players
Reno 1868 FC players
Association football forwards
USL League Two players
USL Championship players
English expatriate sportspeople in the United States